"Black or White" is a song by British rock band Steve Harley & Cockney Rebel, which was released in 1975 as the lead single from their fourth studio album Timeless Flight (1976). The song was written and produced by Harley.

Writing
"Black or White" was inspired by the 1925 poem "The Hollow Men" by the British poet T. S. Eliot. Harley revealed to The Observer in 1976 that T. S. Eliot is a big hero to him, and that he used the form of his poem to write "Black or White". When Harley wrote the song, he intended for it to be a future single.

Speaking of the song's lyrical message, Harley told Record Mirror & Disc in 1975,

Recording
"Black or White" was recorded at Abbey Road Studios in London. The song features a 10-piece choir, made up of members of the band and other backing vocalists, including Madeline Bell, Yvonne Keeley and Barry St. John. The song's strings were arranged by the band's keyboardist Duncan Mackay.

In a 1975 interview with Record Mirror & Disc, Harley said about the song's recording, "I worked very hard on it. I spent seven days and seven nights on the backing tracks and, over three months, I mixed it four times to get it right. The choir we used on it is very big." He added of Mackay's contributions to the track, "The [string arrangement] was done by our keyboard player, Duncan Mackay, using ten celloes and ten violas – no violins. Duncan's a Doctor of Music and knows all about these things, so he was obviously the right man for the job."

Release
"Black or White" was released as single in November 1975, preceding the release of Timeless Flight by three months. Despite the band's UK chart success earlier in 1975 with the number-one single "Make Me Smile (Come Up and See Me)" and its top 20 follow-up "Mr. Raffles (Man, It Was Mean)", "Black or White" failed to enter the UK Singles Chart. It did however reach number two in the BMRB's UK Breakers Chart on 22 November 1975, which would have been equal to number 52 in the UK Singles Chart at a time when the national chart only ran to the top 50.

In his 1975 interview with Record Mirror & Disc, Harley complained that the song's lack of success was due to the limited airplay it received on BBC Radio, "I'm very proud of the track. It isn't getting BBC airplay though, and I feel very let down by them. However, it is encouraging that the few people who have heard the record on the smaller commercial stations have liked it enough to go out and buy it." Speaking of the single's chart failure to Record Mirror & Disc in early 1976, Harley commented, "I knew it was either going to be massive – top three – or a complete stiff. It turned out to be a stiff." Later in 2011, Harley was also critical of EMI's handling of the release, commenting, "They didn't get it in the right shops at the right time and promote it properly."

"Black or White" was released by EMI Records as a 7-inch single in the UK, the Netherlands, Belgium, Germany, Italy and Japan. The B-side is a live version of "Mad, Mad Moonlight", an album track originally recorded for the band's 1975 album The Best Years of Our Lives. This version was recorded live at the Hammersmith Odeon, London, on 14 April 1975.

Promotion
Due to the band's touring commitments in the United States in late 1975, making a potential appearance on Top of the Pops difficult, a £3,000 music video was shot in Studio 3 at Abbey Road Studios for the single. It was directed by Mick Rock, who was also responsible for the photographs and sleeve design for Timeless Flight. The hoodie which Harley wore in the video was made by Yvonne Keeley, who was his girlfriend and backing vocalist at the time.

In the UK, the band performed the song live on the ITV music programme Supersonic, but the footage has since been wiped and presumed lost. In the Netherlands, the band performed the song on the AVRO TV show TopPop. According to an article in the Dutch-Belgian magazine Joepie, Harley was "anything but cooperative and gave the director a lot of headaches" during filming.

In November 2012, the band performed the song live at the Birmingham Symphony Hall, alongside the first two Cockney Rebel albums in their entirety. The performance was released on both CD and DVD in 2013 as Birmingham (Live with Orchestra & Choir).

Critical reception
On its release, Ray Fox-Cumming of Record Mirror & Disc noted the song's "heavy piano cadences", "full blast orchestra", "massive chorus" and "interesting [but] incomprehensible lyrics". He also drew some similarity between "Black or White" and Queen's "Bohemian Rhapsody" for both being "grandiose affairs" of "epic length and proportions". He added, "This, however, is a more coherent opus than Queen's and to my mind, the better record." He predicted the song would be a number one hit. Burton Daily Mail felt the song would not be a hit, describing it as "a slow to grow orchestrated ballad that would sound better as an album track". Dutch-Belgian magazine Joepie felt the song was "a worthy successor" to "Make Me Smile (Come Up and See Me)".

In a review of Timeless Flight, Angus Mackinnon of Street Life encouraged listeners to "swoon to the widescreen piano arpeggios introducing 'Black or White' and the song's orchestral arrangements, both courtesy of Mackay". He considered the lyrics to "concern the spiritual state of man". Stewart Parker, for his "High Pop" column in The Irish Times said, "T. S. Elliott verses kick off the second side in 'Black or White', which contains perhaps the most tuneless singing on the album."

Dave Thompson of AllMusic retrospectively reviewed Timeless Flight and noted the song displayed "deliberately impenetrable wordplay", but highlighted it as an album standout by labelling it an 'AMG Pick Track'. In 2003, Martin Aston of Q wrote, "Timeless Flight bears plenty of Harley's melodic hallmarks, but some complex tripwires keep popping up: 'Black or White' is a rare showing of Rebel soulfulness but the tempo is lethargic."

Track listing
7-inch single
"Black or White" – 5:43
"Mad, Mad Moonlight" (Live) – 5:03

Personnel
Steve Harley & Cockney Rebel
 Steve Harley – vocals
 Jim Cregan – guitar, backing vocals
 George Ford – bass guitar, backing vocals
 Duncan Mackay – keyboards, string arrangement on "Black or White"
 Stuart Elliott – drums, percussion

Additional musicians
 Lindsey Elliott – percussion
 Madeline Bell, Peter Clarke, Yvonne Keeley, Barry St. John, Larry Steele, Liza Strike, Leroy Wiggins, Joy Yates – backing vocals

Production
 Steve Harley – producer
 John Kurlander, John Leckie – engineers
 Tony Clark – remix engineer
 Chris Blair – master cutter

Charts

References

1975 songs
1975 singles
Steve Harley songs
Songs written by Steve Harley
EMI Records singles